Earl Kenneth Hines, also known as Earl "Fatha" Hines (December 28, 1903 – April 22, 1983), was an American jazz pianist and bandleader. He was one of the most influential figures in the development of jazz piano and, according to one source, "one of a small number of pianists whose playing shaped the history of jazz".

The trumpeter Dizzy Gillespie (a member of Hines's big band, along with Charlie Parker) wrote,
The piano is the basis of modern harmony. This little guy came out of Chicago, Earl Hines. He changed the style of the piano. You can find the roots of Bud Powell, Herbie Hancock, all the guys who came after that. If it hadn't been for Earl Hines blazing the path for the next generation to come, it's no telling where or how they would be playing now. There were individual variations but the style of … the modern piano came from Earl Hines.

The pianist Lennie Tristano said, "Earl Hines is the only one of us capable of creating real jazz and real swing when playing all alone." Horace Silver said, "He has a completely unique style. No one can get that sound, no other pianist". Erroll Garner said, "When you talk about greatness, you talk about Art Tatum and Earl Hines".

Count Basie said that Hines was "the greatest piano player in the world".

Biography

Early life
Earl Hines was born in Duquesne, Pennsylvania, 12 miles from the center of Pittsburgh, in 1903. His father, Joseph Hines, played cornet and was the leader of the Eureka Brass Band in Pittsburgh, and his stepmother was a church organist. Hines intended to follow his father on cornet, but "blowing" hurt him behind the ears, whereas the piano did not. The young Hines took lessons in playing classical piano. By the age of eleven he was playing the organ in his Baptist church. He had a "good ear and a good memory" and could replay songs after hearing them in theaters and park concerts: "I'd be playing songs from these shows months before the song copies came out. That astonished a lot of people and they'd ask where I heard these numbers and I'd tell them at the theatre where my parents had taken me." Later, Hines said that he was playing piano around Pittsburgh "before the word 'jazz' was even invented".

Early career
With his father's approval, Hines left home at the age of 17 to take a job playing piano with Lois Deppe and His Symphonian Serenaders in the Liederhaus, a Pittsburgh nightclub. He got his board, two meals a day, and $15 a week. Deppe, a well-known baritone concert artist who sang both classical and popular songs, also used the young Hines as his concert accompanist and took him on his concert trips to New York. In 1921, Hines and Deppe became the first African Americans to perform on radio. Hines's first recordings were accompanying Deppe – four sides recorded for Gennett Records in 1923, still in the very early days of sound recording. Only two of these were issued, one of which was a Hines composition, "Congaine", "a keen snappy foxtrot", which also featured a solo by Hines. He entered the studio again with Deppe a month later to record spirituals and popular songs, including "Sometimes I Feel Like a Motherless Child" and "For the Last Time Call Me Sweetheart". He also accompanied Ethel Waters, describing his strategy as playing "under what the artist is doing" by listening "to the changes she made."

In 1925, after much family debate, Hines moved to Chicago, Illinois, then the world's jazz capital, the home of Jelly Roll Morton and King Oliver. Hines started in Elite No. 2 Club but soon joined Carroll Dickerson's band, with whom he also toured on the Pantages Theatre Circuit to Los Angeles and back.

Hines met Louis Armstrong in the poolroom of the Black Musicians' Union, local 208, on State and 39th in Chicago. Hines was 21, Armstrong 24. They played the union's piano together. Armstrong was astounded by Hines's avant-garde "trumpet-style" piano playing, often using dazzlingly fast octaves so that on none-too-perfect upright pianos (and with no amplification) "they could hear me out front". Richard Cook wrote in Jazz Encyclopedia that

Armstrong and Hines became good friends and shared a car. Armstrong joined Hines in Carroll Dickerson's band at the Sunset Cafe. In 1927, this became Armstrong's band under the musical direction of Hines. Later that year, Armstrong revamped his Okeh Records recording-only band, Louis Armstrong and His Hot Five, and hired Hines as the pianist, replacing his wife, Lil Hardin Armstrong, on the instrument.

Armstrong and Hines then recorded what are often regarded as some of the most important jazz records ever made.

In the days of 78s, recording engineers were unable to play back a take without rendering the wax master unusable for commercial release, so the band did not hear the final version of "West End Blues" until it was issued by Okeh a few weeks later. "Earl Hines, he was surprised when the record came out on the market, 'cause he brought it by my house, you know, we'd forgotten we'd recorded it", Armstrong recalled in 1956. But they liked what they heard. "When it first came out", Hines said, "Louis and I stayed by that recording practically an hour and a half or two hours and we just knocked each other out because we had no idea it was gonna turn out as good as it did."

The Sunset Cafe closed in 1927. Hines, Armstrong, and the drummer Zutty Singleton agreed that they would become the "Unholy Three" – they would "stick together and not play for anyone unless the three of us were hired". But as Louis Armstrong and His Stompers (with Hines as musical director), they ran into difficulties trying to establish their own venue, the Warwick Hall Club, which they rented for a year with the management help of Lil Hardin Armstrong. Hines went briefly to New York and returned to find that Armstrong and Singleton had rejoined the rival Dickerson band at the new Savoy Ballroom in his absence, leaving Hines feeling "warm". When Armstrong and Singleton later asked him to join them with Dickerson at the Savoy Ballroom, Hines said, "No, you guys left me in the rain and broke the little corporation we had".

Hines joined the clarinetist Jimmie Noone at the Apex, an after-hours speakeasy, playing from midnight to 6 a.m., seven nights a week. In 1928, he recorded 14 sides with Noone and again with Armstrong (for a total of 38 sides with Armstrong). His first piano solos were recorded late that year: eight for QRS Records in New York and then seven for Okeh Records in Chicago, all except two his own compositions.

Hines moved in with Kathryn Perry (with whom he had recorded "Sadie Green the Vamp of New Orleans"). Hines said of her, "She'd been at The Sunset too, in a dance act. She was a very charming, pretty girl. She had a good voice and played the violin. I had been divorced and she became my common-law wife. We lived in a big apartment and her parents stayed with us". Perry recorded several times with Hines, including "Body and Soul" in 1935. They stayed together until 1940, when Hines "divorced" her to marry Ann Jones Reed, but that marriage was soon "indefinitely postponed".

Hines married singer 'Lady of Song' Janie Moses in 1947. They had two daughters, Janear (born 1950) and Tosca. Both daughters died before he did, Tosca in 1976 and Janear in 1981. Janie divorced him on June 14, 1979, and died in 2007.

Chicago years
On December 28, 1928 (his 25th birthday and six weeks before the Saint Valentine's Day Massacre), Hines opened at Chicago's Grand Terrace Cafe leading his own big band, a prestigious position in the jazz world at the time. "All America was dancing", Hines said, and for the next 12 years and through the worst of the Great Depression and Prohibition, Hines's band was the orchestra at the Grand Terrace. The Hines Orchestra – or "Organization", as Hines preferred it – had up to 28 musicians and did three shows a night at the Grand Terrace, four shows every Saturday and sometimes Sundays. According to Stanley Dance, "Earl Hines and The Grand Terrace were to Chicago what Duke Ellington and The Cotton Club were to New York – but fierier."

The Grand Terrace was controlled by the gangster Al Capone, so Hines became Capone's "Mr Piano Man". The Grand Terrace upright piano was soon replaced by a white $3,000 Bechstein grand. Talking about those days Hines later said:

From the Grand Terrace, Hines and his band broadcast on "open mikes" over many years, sometimes seven nights a week, coast-to-coast across America – Chicago being well placed to deal with live broadcasting across time zones in the United States. The Hines band became the most broadcast band in America. Among the listeners were a young Nat King Cole and Jay McShann in Kansas City, who said his "real education came from Earl Hines. When 'Fatha' went off the air, I went to bed." Hines's most significant "student" was Art Tatum.

The Hines band usually comprised 15–20 musicians on stage, occasionally up to 28. Among the band's many members were Wallace Bishop, Alvin Burroughs, Scoops Carry, Oliver Coleman, Bob Crowder, Thomas Crump, George Dixon, Julian Draper, Streamline Ewing, Ed Fant, Milton Fletcher, Walter Fuller, Dizzy Gillespie, Leroy Harris, Woogy Harris, Darnell Howard, Cecil Irwin, Harry 'Pee Wee' Jackson, Warren Jefferson, Budd Johnson, Jimmy Mundy, Ray Nance, Charlie Parker, Willie Randall, Omer Simeon, Cliff Smalls, Leon Washington, Freddie Webster, Quinn Wilson and Trummy Young.

Occasionally, Hines allowed another pianist sit in for him, the better to allow him to conduct the whole "Organization". Jess Stacy was one, Nat "King" Cole and Teddy Wilson were others, but Cliff Smalls was his favorite.

Each summer, Hines toured with his whole band for three months, including through the South – the first black big band to do so. He explained, "[when] we traveled by train through the South, they would send a porter back to our car to let us know when the dining room was cleared, and then we would all go in together. We couldn't eat when we wanted to. We had to eat when they were ready for us."

In Duke Ellington's America, Harvey G. Cohen writes:

The birth of bebop

In 1942, Hines provided the saxophonist Charlie Parker with his big break, although Parker was subsequently fired soon after for his "time-keeping" – by which Hines meant his inability to show up on time – despite Parker resorting to sleeping under the band stage in his attempts to be punctual. Dizzie Gillespie joined the same year.

The Grand Terrace Cafe had closed suddenly in December 1940; its manager, Ed Fox, disappeared. The 37-year-old Hines, always famously good to work for, took his band on the road full-time for the next eight years, resisting renewed offers from Benny Goodman to join his band as piano player.

Hines's band encountered trouble when several of its members were drafted into the armed forces in World War II. Six were drafted in 1943 alone. As a result, on August 19, 1943, Hines had to cancel the rest of his Southern tour. He went to New York and hired a "draft-proof" 12-piece all-woman group, which lasted two months. Next, Hines expanded it into a 28-piece band (17 men, 11 women), including strings and French horn. Despite these wartime difficulties, Hines took his bands on tour from coast to coast, but was still able to take time out from his own band to front the Duke Ellington Orchestra in 1944 when Ellington fell ill.

It was during this time (and especially during the recording ban during the 1942–44 musicians' strike) that late-night jam sessions with members of Hines's band sowed the seeds for the emerging new style in jazz, bebop. Ellington later said that "the seeds of bop were in Earl Hines's piano style". Charlie Parker's biographer Ross Russell wrote:

As early as 1940, saxophone player and arranger Budd Johnson had "re-written the book" for Hines's band in a more modern style. Johnson and Billy Eckstine, Hines's vocalist between 1939 and 1943, have been credited with helping to bring modern players into the Hines band in the transition between swing and bebop. Apart from Parker and Gillespie, other Hines 'modernists' included Gene Ammons, Gail Brockman, Scoops Carry, Goon Gardner, Wardell Gray, Bennie Green, Benny Harris, Harry 'Pee-Wee' Jackson, Shorty McConnell, Cliff Smalls, Shadow Wilson and Sarah Vaughan, who replaced Eckstine as the band singer in 1943 and stayed for a year.

Dizzy Gillespie said of the music the band evolved:

The links to bebop remained close. Parker's discographer, among others, has argued that "Yardbird Suite", which Parker recorded with Miles Davis in March 1946, was in fact based on Hines's "Rosetta", which nightly served as the Hines band theme-tune.

Dizzy Gillespie described the Hines band, saying, "We had a beautiful, beautiful band with Earl Hines. He's a master and you learn a lot from him, self-discipline and organization."

In July 1946, Hines suffered serious head injuries in a car crash near Houston which, despite an operation, affected his eyesight for the rest of his life. Back on the road again four months later, he continued to lead his big band for two more years. In 1947, Hines bought the biggest nightclub in Chicago, The El Grotto, but with the declining popularity of big-band music, it soon foundered and Hines lost $30,000 ($ today).

Rediscovery

In early 1948, Hines joined up again with Armstrong in the "Louis Armstrong and His All-Stars" "small-band". It was not without its strains for Hines. A year later, Armstrong became the first jazz musician to appear on the cover of Time magazine (on February 21, 1949). Armstrong was by then on his way to becoming an American icon, leaving Hines to feel he was being used only as a sideman in comparison to his old friend. Discussing the difficulties, mainly over billing, Armstrong stated, "Hines and his ego, ego, ego ..." Three years later and to Armstrong's annoyance, Hines left the All Stars in 1951.

Next, back as leader again, Hines took his own small combos around the United States. He started with a markedly more modern lineup than the aging All Stars: Bennie Green, Art Blakey, Tommy Potter, and Etta Jones. In 1954, he toured his then seven-piece group nationwide with the Harlem Globetrotters. In 1958, he broadcast on the American Forces Network but by the start of the jazz-lean 1960s, the aging Hines settled "home" in Oakland, California, with his wife and two young daughters, opened a tobacconist's, and came close to giving up the profession.

In 1964, Stanley Dance, Hines's determined friend and unofficial manager, convinced Hines to perform a series of recitals at the Little Theatre in New York. They were the first piano recitals Hines had ever given; they caused a sensation, leading Hines to be "suddenly rediscovered". "What is there left to hear after you've heard Earl Hines?", asked John Wilson of The New York Times. Hines then won the 1966 International Critics Poll for DownBeat magazine's Hall of Fame. DownBeat also elected him the world's "No. 1 Jazz Pianist" in 1966 (and did so again five more times). Jazz Journal awarded his LPs of the year first and second in its overall poll and first, second and third in its piano category. Jazz voted him "Jazzman of the Year" and picked him for its number 1 and number 2 places in the category Piano Recordings. Hines was invited to appear on TV shows hosted by Johnny Carson and Mike Douglas.

From then until his death twenty years later, Hines recorded endlessly, both solo and with contemporaries like Cat Anderson, Harold Ashby, Barney Bigard, Lawrence Brown, Dave Brubeck (they recorded duets in 1975), Jaki Byard (duets in 1972), Benny Carter, Buck Clayton, Cozy Cole, Wallace Davenport, Eddie "Lockjaw" Davis, Vic Dickenson, Roy Eldridge, Duke Ellington (duets in 1966), Ella Fitzgerald, Panama Francis, Bud Freeman, Stan Getz, Dizzy Gillespie, Paul Gonsalves, Stephane Grappelli, Sonny Greer, Lionel Hampton, Coleman Hawkins, Milt Hinton, Johnny Hodges, Peanuts Hucko, Helen Humes, Budd Johnson, Jonah Jones, Max Kaminsky, Gene Krupa, Ellis Larkins, Shelly Manne, Marian McPartland (duets in 1970), Gerry Mulligan, Ray Nance, Oscar Peterson (duets in 1968), Russell Procope, Pee Wee Russell, Jimmy Rushing, Stuff Smith, Rex Stewart, Maxine Sullivan, Buddy Tate, Jack Teagarden, Clark Terry, Sarah Vaughan, Joe Venuti, Earle Warren, Ben Webster, Teddy Wilson (duets in 1965 and 1970), Jimmy Witherspoon, Jimmy Woode and Lester Young. Possibly more surprising were Alvin Batiste, Tony Bennett, Art Blakey, Teresa Brewer, Barbara Dane, Richard Davis, Elvin Jones, Etta Jones, the Ink Spots, Peggy Lee, Helen Merrill, Charles Mingus, Oscar Pettiford, Vi Redd, Betty Roché, Caterina Valente, Dinah Washington, and Ry Cooder (on the song "Ditty Wah Ditty").

But the most highly regarded recordings of this period are his solo performances, "a whole orchestra by himself". Whitney Balliett wrote of his solo recordings and performances of this time:

Hines recorded solo tributes to Armstrong, Hoagy Carmichael, Ellington, George Gershwin and Cole Porter in the 1970s, sometimes on the 1904 12-legged Steinway given to him in 1969 by Scott Newhall, the managing editor of the San Francisco Chronicle. In 1974, when he was in his seventies, Hines recorded sixteen LPs. "A spate of solo recording meant that, in his old age, Hines was being comprehensively documented at last, and he rose to the challenge with consistent inspirational force". From his 1964 "comeback" until his death, Hines recorded over 100 LPs all over the world. Within the industry, he became legendary for going into a studio and coming out an hour and a half later having recorded an unplanned solo LP. Retakes were almost unheard of except when Hines wanted to try a tune again in some other way, often completely different.

From 1964 on, Hines often toured Europe, especially France. He toured South America in 1968. He performed in Asia, Australia, Japan and, in 1966, the Soviet Union, in tours funded by the U.S. State Department. During his six-week tour of the Soviet Union, in which he performed 35 concerts, the 10,000-seat Kyiv Sports Palace was sold out. As a result, the Kremlin cancelled his Moscow and Leningrad concerts as being "too culturally dangerous".

Final years
Arguably still playing as well as he ever had, Hines displayed individualistic quirks (including grunts) in these performances. He sometimes sang as he played, especially his own "They Didn't Believe I Could Do It ... Neither Did I". In 1975, Hines was the subject of an hour-long television documentary film made by ATV (for Britain's commercial ITV channel), out-of-hours at the Blues Alley nightclub in Washington, DC. The International Herald Tribune described it as "the greatest jazz film ever made".  In the film, Hines said, "The way I like to play is that ... I'm an explorer, if I might use that expression, I'm looking for something all the time ... almost like I'm trying to talk." In 1979, Hines was inducted into the Black Filmmakers Hall of Fame. He played solo at Duke Ellington's funeral, played solo twice at the White House, for the President of France and for the Pope. Of this acclaim, Hines said, "Usually they give people credit when they're dead. I got my flowers while I was living".

Hines's last show took place in San Francisco a few days before he died of a heart attack in Oakland. As he had wished, his Steinway was auctioned for the benefit of gifted low-income music students, still bearing its silver plaque:

presented by jazz lovers from all over the world. this piano is the only one of its kind in the world and expresses the great genius of a man who has never played a melancholy note in his lifetime on a planet that has often succumbed to despair..

Hines was buried in Evergreen Cemetery in Oakland, California.

Style
The Oxford Companion to Jazz describes Hines as "the most important pianist in the transition from stride to swing" and continues:

Hines himself described meeting Armstrong:

Hines continued:

In their book Jazz (2009), Gary Giddins and Scott DeVeaux wrote of Hines's style of the time:

In his book Louis Armstrong: Master of Modernism, Thomas Brothers described Hines's style:Rhythmically, Hines was very good at taking his melodic lines further and further way from the fixed foundation, creating a radical sense of detachment for a few beats or measures, only to land back in time with great aplomb when finished with his foray. The left hand sometimes joins in the action...What is especially distinctive about Hines are the startling effects he creates by harmonically enhancing these rhythmic departures. Like Armstrong, he thought of chords creatively and with great precision. But he was a step ahead of his colleague in his willingness to experiment. He became fond of radical dislocations, sudden turns of directions with dim and nonexistent connection to the ground harmony.Pianist Teddy Wilson wrote of Hines's style:

Oliver Jackson was Hines's frequent drummer (as well as a drummer for Oscar Peterson, Benny Goodman, Lionel Hampton, Duke Ellington, Teddy Wilson and many others. He described Hines's style as follows:

The Biographical Encyclopedia of Jazz gives the following description of Hines's 1965 style:

Later still, then in his seventies and after a host of recent solo recordings, Hines himself said:

Discography

 Earl Hines (Columbia, 1951)
 Fats Waller Songs (Brunswick, 1952)
 Louis Armstrong and His Hot Five with Earl Hines (Odeon, 1954)
 Fatha Plays Fats (Fantasy, 1956)
 Solo (America, 1956)
 Oh, "Father"! (Epic, 1956)
 The Incomparable Earl "Fatha" Hines (Tops, 1957)
 The Earl Hines Trio (Epic, 1958)
 Earl Hines (Philips, 1958)
 Earl's Pearls (MGM, 1960)
 A Monday Date (Riverside, 1961)
 Earl "Fatha" Hines (Capitol, 1963)
 Spontaneous Explorations (Contact, 1964)
 Up to Date with Earl Hines (RCA Victor, 1965)
 Paris Session (Columbia, 1965)
 The Real Earl Hines Recorded Live! in Concert (Focus, 1965)
 Once Upon a Time (Impulse!, 1966)
 Stride Right with Johnny Hodges (Verve, 1966)
 Here Comes Earl "Fatha" Hines (Contact, 1966)
 Dinah (RCA Victor, 1966)
 The Great Earl Hines (Polydor, 1966)
 Blues in Thirds (Fontana, 1966)
 Jazz Meanz Hines! (Fontana, 1967)
 Swing's Our Thing with Johnny Hodges (Verve, 1968)
 Blues & Things with Jimmy Rushing (Master Jazz, 1968)
 The Incomparable Earl "Fatha" Hines (Fantasy, 1968)
 "Fatha" Blows Best (Decca, 1968)
 Earl Hines at Home (Delmark, 1969)
 Earl Fatha Hines (Everest, 1970)
 The Quintessential Recording Session (Halycon, 1970)
 Fatha & His Flock on Tour (MPS, 1970)
 Live at the Overseas Press Club with Maxine Sullivan (Chiaroscuro, 1970)
 All Star Jazz Session (Springboard, 1970)
 Tea for Two (Black Lion, 1971)
 Earl Hines Plays Duke Ellington (Master Jazz, 1971)
 Hines Does Hoagy (Audiophile, 1971)
 My Tribute to Louis (Audiophile, 1971)
 Comes in Handy (Audiophile, 1971)
 Hines Plays Hines (Swaggie, 1972)
 Earl Hines (GNP Crescendo, 1972)
 The Mighty Fatha (Flying Dutchman, 1973)
 Tour de Force (Black Lion, 1972)
 Quintessential Continued (Chiaroscuro, 1973)
 Earl Hines Plays George Gershwin (1973)
 Earl Hines at Sundown (Black and Blue, 1974)
 It Don't Mean a Thing If It Ain't Got That Swing! with Paul Gonsalves (Black Lion, 1974)
 Earl Hines Plays Cole Porter (Swaggie, 1974)
 Hines '74 (Black & Blue, 1974)
 Quintessential '74 (Chiaroscuro, 1974)
 Another Monday Date (Prestige, 1974)
 Earl Hines in New Orleans Vol. 1 (Up, 1975)
 Tour de Force Encore (Black Lion, 1975)
 Earl Hines in New Orleans Vol. 2 (1975)
 Duet! (MPS, 1975) – with Jaki Byard
 West Side Story (Black Lion, 1975)
 At the Village Vanguard with Roy Eldridge (Xanadu, 1975)
 Fireworks (RCA, 1975)
 Earl Hines at Club Hangover Vol. 5 (Storyville, 1976)
 Hot Sonatas with Joe Venuti (Chiaroscuro, 1976)
 Live at Buffalo (Improv, 1976)
 Earl Hines at Saralee's (Fairmont, 1976)
 Earl Hines in New Orleans (Chiaroscuro, 1977)
 Lionel Hampton Presents Earl Hines (Who's Who in Jazz, 1977)
 The Giants with Stephane Grappelli (Black Lion, 1977)
 An Evening with Earl Hines (Chiaroscuro, 1977)
 Live at the New School (Chiaroscuro, 1977)
 Solo Walk in Tokyo (Biography, 1977)
 Swingin' Away (Black Lion, 1977)
 Jazz Is His Old Lady...and My Old Man with Marva Josie (Catalyst, 1977)
 Earl Meets Harry (Black and Blue, 1978)
 One for My Baby (Black Lion, 1978)
 The Dirty Old Men (Black and Blue, 1978)
 Earl Fatha Hines and His All Stars (GNP Crescendo, 1978)
 We Love You Fats with Teresa Brewer (Doctor Jazz, 1978)
 Partners in Jazz with Jaki Byard (MPS, 1978)
 Linger Awhile (Bluebird, 1979)
 The Indispensable Earl Hines Vol. 1 and 2 (RCA, 1979)
 The Indispensable Earl Hines Vol. 3 and 4 (RCA, 1981)
 Deep Forest (Black Lion, 1982)
 The Legendary Little Theater Concert of 1964 Vols. 1 & 2 (Muse, 1983)
 Texas Ruby Red (Black Lion, 1983)
 Fatha (Quicksilver, 1983)
 Live and in Living Jazz (Quicksilver, 1983)
 Earl Hines and His Esquire All Stars Featuring Dicky Wells (Storyville, 1985)
 Varieties! (Xanadu, 1985)
 Earl's Backroom and Cozy's Caravan (Felsted, 1986)
 Live at the Village Vanguard (Columbia, 1988)
 Earl Hines Plays Duke Ellington (1988)
 Reunion in Brussels (Red Baron, 1992)
 Earl Hines and the Duke's Men (Delmark, 1994)
 Live Aalborg Denmark 1965 (Storyville, 1994)
 Grand Reunion (Verve, 1995)
 Earl Hines Plays Duke Ellington Volume Two (1997)
 Classic Earl Hines Sessions 1928-1943 (Mosaic Records, 2012)

Notes
Footnotes

Citations

References
 .
 .
 Basie, Count; Murray, Albert (2002), Good Morning Blues: The Autobiography of Count Basie, Da Capo Press, .
 Berliner, Paul F. (1994), Thinking in Jazz: The Infinite Art of Improvisation, Chicago and London: University of Chicago Press, .
 .
 .
 .
 .
 .
 
 
 Dempsey, Peter (2001), "Earl Hines", Naxos Jazz Legends, Retrieved July 23, 2006.
 .
 Downbeat (2009), The Great Jazz Interviews, Frank Alkyer and Ed Enright, eds., Hal Leonard Books, .
 .
 Feather, Leonard (1960), The Encyclopedia of Jazz, Horizon Press, .
 
 .
 .
 Harrison, Max; Fox, Charles; Thacker, Eric (1984), The Essential Jazz Records,  Vol. 1, Da Capo Press, .
 "Earl Hines", World Book Encyclopedia. Retrieved July 23, 2006.
 "Earl 'Fatha' Hines", The Red Hot Jazz Archive. Retrieved July 23, 2006.
 .
 Komara, Edward M (1998), The Dial Recordings of Charlie Parker: A Discography, Westport, Connecticut: Greenwood Press, .
 
 Palmer, Robert (1981), "Pop Jazz: Fatha Hines Stom[p]ing and Chomping On at 75", New York Times, August 28, 1981, retrieved from New York Times, July 30, 2006, .
 Ratliff, Ben (2002), The New York Times Essential Library: Jazz, New York: Times Books, .
 The Rough Guide to Jazz (2004), 3rd ed., "Earl Hines", pp. 262–263, Rough Guides, .
 .
 Schuller, Gunther (1991), The Swing Era: The Development of Jazz, 1930–1945, Oxford University Press, pp. 263–292, .
 Simon, George T. (1974), The Big Bands, Macmillan.
 
 Taylor, Jeffrey (2002), "Earl Hines and 'Rosetta'", Current Musicology, special issue, A Commemorative Festschrift in Honor of Mark Tucker (Spring 2001–Spring 2002), pp. 71–73.
 Taylor, Jeffrey (2002), "Life with Fatha", I.S.A.M. Newsletter 30 (Fall 2000).
 Taylor, Jeffrey (1998), "Louis Armstrong, Earl Hines, and 'Weather Bird'", Musical Quarterly'' 82 (Spring 1998).
 .
 .

External links 

 Video: Earl "Fatha" Hines.
One-hour TV documentary, produced and directed by Charlie Nairn. Filmed at Blues Alley jazz club in Washington, D.C. for UK ATV Television in 1975.Original 16mm film, plus out-takes of additional tunes, archived in British Film Institute Library at BFI.org. Also at ITVStudios.com. DVD copies available from the University of California-Berkeley's Jean Gray Hargrove Music Library (which holds The Earl Hines Collection/Archive). Also at the Chicago Jazz Archive, the Hogan Jazz Archive of Tulane University and at the Louis Armstrong House Museum Libraries. See also jazzonfilm.com/documentaries
 Earl Hines at Music of the United States of America (MUSA)
 Earl Hines - Pittsburgh Music History
 
 Earl Hines recordings at the Discography of American Historical Recordings.
 Earl Hines: Greatest Jazz Pianist- Scott Yanow
Classic Earl Hines Sessions 1928-1943- Mosaic Records

1903 births
1983 deaths
American jazz bandleaders
African-American jazz pianists
American male pianists
Apollo Records artists
Big band bandleaders
Burials at Evergreen Cemetery (Oakland, California)
Columbia Records artists
Decca Records artists
Gennett Records artists
Sterling Records (US) artists
Okeh Records artists
Musicians from Pittsburgh
Musicians from Chicago
People from Duquesne, Pennsylvania
Red Baron Records artists
Swing bandleaders
Swing pianists
Xanadu Records artists
20th-century American pianists
Jazz musicians from Illinois
Jazz musicians from Pennsylvania
20th-century American male musicians
American male jazz musicians
Louis Armstrong and His Hot Five members
Black Lion Records artists
Biograph Records artists
Chiaroscuro Records artists
20th-century African-American musicians
Signature Records artists